Cordova or Córdova is a Spanish surname. Notable people with the surname include:

Andrés Córdova (1892–1983), President of Ecuador (1939–1940)
Arturo de Córdova (1908–1973), Mexican film actor
Carmen Córdova (1929–2011), Argentine architect and academic administrator
France A. Córdova (born 1947), American astrophysicist and university administrator
Francisco Córdova (born 1972), Mexican baseball player
Franco Cordova (born 1944), Italian footballer
Frederick de Cordova (1910–2001), American stage, motion picture and television director and producer
Gonzalo Córdova (1863–1928), President of Ecuador (1924–1925)
Gonzalo Fernández de Córdoba (1453–1515), Spanish general
Hugo Córdova, Bolivian chess player
Inés Córdova (1927–2010), Bolivian artist
Jacob De Cordova (1808–1868), British-American businessman and politician
Jair Córdova (born 1996), Peruvian footballer
Jorge Córdova (1822–1862), Bolivian military officer and politician
Jorge Cordova (American football) (born 1981), American football player
Jorge Luis Córdova (1907–1994), American judge, lawyer and politician
José María Córdova (1799–1829), Colombian general and national hero
Juan de Córdova (1503–1595), Spanish Dominican linguist
Luis de Córdova y Córdova (1706–1796), Spanish admiral
Marty Cordova (born 1969), American baseball player
Natalia Cordova-Buckley (born 1982), Mexican-American actress
Nicolás Córdova (born 1979), Chilean footballer
Roberto Suazo Córdova (1927–2018), Honduran politician
Ronald Cordova (born 1946), American politician and lawyer

Spanish-language surnames